Leonard Paul Blair (born April 12, 1949) is an American prelate of the Roman Catholic Church, serving as archbishop of the Archdiocese of Hartford in Connecticut since December 16, 2013.  

Blair previously served as bishop of the Diocese of Toledo in Ohio from 2003 to 2013 and as an auxiliary bishop of the Archdiocese of Detroit in Michigan from 1999 to 2003.

Biography

Early life 
Leonard Blair was born on April 12, 1949, in Detroit, Michigan.  He first studied at Sacred Heart Major Seminary in Detroit, where he obtained a Bachelor of Arts in History.

Priesthood 
Blair was ordained to the priesthood on June 26, 1976 for the Archdiocese of Detroit by Cardinal John Dearden. After his ordination, Blair attended the Pontifical North American University in Rome.  He received the follow degrees in Rome:

 Bachelor of Sacred Theology from the Pontifical Gregorian University 
 Licentiate of Theology with a specialization in patristics and the history of theology from the Gregorian
 Doctor of Theology from the Pontifical University of St. Thomas Aquinas

Blair served as assistant pastor or pastor in several parishes in the archdiocese:

 St. Martin de Porres in Warren
 Our Lady of Queen of Peace in Harper Woods
 St. Christopher in Detroit
 St. Paul in Grosse Pointe Farms

Blair's archdiocesan positions included assignments at vicar general and chancellor. He taught theology and patristics at Sacred Heart Major Seminary, where he also served as dean of studies.  Blair returned to Rome at one point to work as an official of the Prefecture for the Economic Affairs of the Holy See.  After returning to Detroit, he was named as personal secretary to Cardinal Edmund Szoka.

Auxiliary Bishop of Detroit

On July 8, 1999, Blair was appointed by Pope John Paul II as an auxiliary bishop of the Archdiocese of Detroit and Titular Bishop of Voncariana. He received his episcopal consecration on August 24, 1999, at the Cathedral of the Most Blessed Sacrament in Detroit from Cardinal Adam Maida, with Cardinal Szoka and Bishop Dale Melczek serving as co-consecrators.

Bishop of Toledo

Blair was appointed bishop of the Diocese of Toledo by John Paul II on October 7, 2003.  He was installed on December 4, 2003.

On April 28, 2004, Blair suspended the ministry of Gerald Robinson, a diocese priest, after his arrest on murder charges.  Robinson had been charged with killing Sister Margaret Ann Pahl at Mercy Hospital in Toledo, Ohio.  Robinson was convicted of murder in 2006 and sentenced to 15 years to life in prison.

Sisters of St. Francis controversy 
On May 9. 2005, Blair directed the Sisters of St. Francis to cancel a three-workshop by New Ways Ministry at the order's campus in Tiffin, Ohio. In stating his objections, Blair stated:The positions of New Ways Ministry are not at all in accord with the guidelines for pastoral care which the bishops of the United States issued in 2006 regarding 'Ministry to Persons with a Homosexual Inclination.' Nor does New Ways Ministry present the full, authentic teaching of the Catholic Church on homosexuality.

LCWR controversy 
In April 2008, the Congregation for the Doctrine of the Faith (CDR) at the Vatican directed Blair to conduct a doctrinal assessment of the Leadership Conference of Women Religious (LCWR), the umbrella organization for nuns in the United States.  The Vatican was concerned that the LCWR was straying from church priorities and doctrines.  Blair submitted his report to the CDR in 2010, noting that "The current doctrinal and pastoral situation of LCWR is grave and a matter of serious concern."  In April 2012, the CDR appointed Blair,  Archbishop J. Peter Sartain and Archbishop Thomas J. Paprocki to create a plan for the overhaul of the LCWR.  In response, the LCWR voted to reject the CDR plan, creating a standoff.  After the installation of Pope Francis in 2013, pressure on the LCWR eased and by 2015 the CDR had major sanctions against the LCWR.

Komen Foundation controversy 
In July 2011, Blair told parishes and parochial schools in the Diocese of Toledo not to raise funds for the Susan G. Komen Foundation, citing concerns that the money could be used to fund embryonic stem-cell research. Blair stated."As best we can determine, at present the Komen Foundation does not fund cancer research that employs embryonic stem cells. However, their policy does not exclude that possibility. They are open to embryonic stem cell research, and may very well fund such research in the future."Blair's statement also referred to Komen's relationship with Planned Parenthood, a provider of abortion and women's health services. Because of these factors, Blair urged Catholic donors, both corporate and individually, to consider alternate organizations when supporting breast cancer research.

Archbishop of Hartford
Pope Francis appointed Blair as the fifth archbishop of the Archdiocese of Hartford on October 29, 2013; he was installed on December 16, 2013. On January 22, 2019, he announced that the archdiocese had paid a $50.6 million legal settlement to 142 claims of sexual abuse by 29 priests from the archdiocese and three priests from other dioceses, dating back to 1953.  Blair made this statement:It is a cause of profound sorrow and soul searching for me that we bishops have often failed to grasp the spiritual and moral devastation that results from sexual abuse.

See also

 Catholic Church hierarchy
 Catholic Church in the United States
 Historical list of the Catholic bishops of the United States
 List of Catholic bishops of the United States
 Lists of patriarchs, archbishops, and bishops

References

External links

Catholic-Hierarchy
Diocese of Toledo
Leonard P. Blair appointed new archbishop of Hartford
Roman Catholic Archdiocese of Hartford
Roman Catholic Diocese of Toledo

Episcopal succession

 

1949 births
Living people
21st-century Roman Catholic archbishops in the United States
Clergy from Detroit
Pontifical Gregorian University alumni
Pontifical University of Saint Thomas Aquinas alumni
Roman Catholic Archdiocese of Detroit
Roman Catholic bishops of Toledo
Roman Catholic bishops of Hartford
Religious leaders from Michigan
American Roman Catholic archbishops